Megachile bellula is a species of bee in the family Megachilidae. It was described by Charles Thomas Bingham in 1897.

References

Bellula
Insects described in 1897